The Santa Marta sabrewing (Campylopterus phainopeplus) is a Critically Endangered species of hummingbird in the "emeralds", tribe Trochilini of subfamily Trochilinae. It is endemic to the Sierra Nevada de Santa Marta of northeastern Colombia. It is one of 24 bird species that are endemic to the Santa Marta highlands.

Taxonomy and systematics

The Santa Marta sabrewing has at times been placed in genus Saepiopterus. It is monotypic.

Description

Both sexes have a decurved black bill, with the female's having more curvature, and both have a white spot behind the eye. Males' upperparts are glittering emerald green. They have a black face; their throat and breast are iridescent blue and the rest of their underparts dark green. Their tail is dark steely blue. The female has shining green upperparts and mostly grayish white underparts with green flanks and undertail coverts. Its tail is mostly green with grayish tips on the outermost pair of feathers.

Distribution and habitat

The Santa Marta sabrewing is known only from the northeastern and southern slopes of the isolated Sierra Nevada de Santa Marta of northeastern Colombia. It inhabits the edges of humid forest, plantations (especially of bananas), and bushy páramo.

Behavior

Movement

The Santa Marta sabrewing spends the dry season of February to May below  and moves higher, even as far as the snow line, during the June to October wet season.

Feeding

Almost nothing is known about the Santa Marta sabrewing's feeding strategy or diet. It is known to feed on flowering banana (Musa) and to be territorial.

Breeding

Santa Marta sabrewings in breeding condition have been found between April and June, and males have been seen displaying in June and July. Nothing else is known about the species' breeding phenology and its nest has not been described.

Vocalization

As of mid-2022 only one recording of the Santa Marta sabrewing is known. It makes "a plaintive double 'twit-twit', both in flight and display."

Status

The IUCN originally assessed the Santa Marta sabrewing as Near Threatened, then in 2000 as Endangered, and since 2020 as Critically Endangered. It has a very small range and is thought to number fewer than 50 mature individuals. About 85% of the original vegetation within its range has been destroyed by logging and conversion to agriculture, grazing, and human habitation. What remains is degraded and fragmented. Further losses are expected due to human activity and climate change. The latter is causing the dry season to expand which increases the risk of fire. Some details of habitat loss were published in 2016. 

Until about 1900 the Santa Marta Sabrewing was described as fairly common, and it was recorded intermittently until 1946. It was not recorded again until 2010 and was then again "lost" until 2022, when its survival was confirmed by photographic evidence of an individual male, found by chance.

References

External links
BirdLife Species Factsheet.
 https://www.nytimes.com/2010/04/13/science/13obbird.html?ref=science

Santa Marta sabrewing
Santa Marta sabrewing
Santa Marta sabrewing
Critically endangered animals
Santa Marta sabrewing
Santa Marta sabrewing
Santa Marta sabrewing
Santa Marta sabrewing
Taxonomy articles created by Polbot